Algeria is a country in North Africa.

Algeria or Al-Jazair may also refer to:

 Zirid dynasty a Berber dynasty originating from Algeria, which built the modern city of Algiers
 Kingdom of Tlemcen an Algerian-Zenata kingdom.
 Regency of Algiers, a north African state
French Algeria, a French colony in modern-day Algeria
Algeria, West Virginia, an unincorporated community in the United States
 1213 Algeria, an asteroid
Algiers, the capital of Algeria
 Algérie, a French treaty cruiser

See also
 
 
 Algiers (disambiguation)
 Alger (disambiguation)